Hans Jaksch (29 October 1879 – 8 January 1970) was an Austrian architect. His work was part of the architecture event in the art competition at the 1948 Summer Olympics.

References

1879 births
1970 deaths
20th-century Austrian architects
Olympic competitors in art competitions
People from Česká Lípa District